The 2015–16 Barako Bull Energy season was the 14th and final season of the franchise in the Philippine Basketball Association (PBA). After the Philippine Cup the franchise was sold to Phoenix Petroleum and renamed as the Phoenix Fuel Masters which played its first tournament in the Commissioner's Cup.

Key dates

2015
August 23: The 2015 PBA draft took place in Midtown Atrium, Robinson Place Manila.

2016
January 20: The PBA approved the sale of the Barako Bull franchise to Phoenix Petroleum Philippines.

Draft picks

Roster
S

Philippine Cup

Eliminations

Standings

Game log

Playoffs

Bracket

Transactions

Trades
Pre-season

Philippine Cup

References

Barako Bull Energy seasons
Barako Bull